Platygyriella fragilifolia is a species of moss in the genus Platygyriella. It was first described as Trachyphyllum fragilifolium by Hugh Neville Dixon in 1938. It was discovered in India and only occurs in Asia.

References

Hypnaceae
Plants described in 1984
Taxa named by William Russel Buck
Flora of India (region)